Bhavani is a 2009 Indian Tamil-language crime thriller soap opera that aired on Kalaignar TV from 9 February 2009 Monday to Thursday at 20:00 (IST) and ended with 116 Episodes. The show stars Bhavana, Neelima Rani, Subhalekha Sudhakar, Vadivukkarasi, Bharathy, Kavya, and Revathy Priya, and is directed by Rasool.

From 12 February 2015 the show was relaunched on Kalaignar TV and aired Monday through Friday at 20:00 (IST) and the show was shifted to a 18:30 (IST) time slot.

Cast
 Bhavana (Episode 1-73)
 Neelima Rani (Episode 73-116)
 Vijaya Bharathy
 Subhalekha Sudhakar (Episode 1-73)
 Vadivukkarasi (Episode 1-73)
 Kavya
 Vijay Sarathy
 Revathy Priya
 Anpu
 Raja
 Mahesh
 Sasi
 Elispath
 Varsha
 Poovannan
 Mallika
 Valli
 Mahesh

International broadcast
The series was released on 9 February 2009 on Kalaignar TV. The show was also broadcast internationally on the channel's international distribution. It aired in Sri Lanka, Singapore, Malaysia, South East Asia,the Middle East, Oceania, South Africa and Sub Saharan Africa on Kalaignar TV, and also aired in the United States, Canada, and Europe on Kalaignar Ayngaran TV. The show's episodes were released on the Kalaignar TV YouTube channel.

References

External links
 

Kalaignar TV television series
Tamil-language legal television series
Tamil-language thriller television series
2000s Tamil-language television series
2015 Tamil-language television series debuts
Tamil-language television shows
2015 Tamil-language television series endings